The Associated Press (AP), Newspaper Enterprise Association (NEA), New York Daily News (NYDN), The Sporting News (SN), and United Press International (UPI) selected All-Pro teams comprising their selections of the best players at each position in the National Football League (NFL) during the 1958 NFL season.

Offensive selections

Quarterbacks
 Johnny Unitas, Baltimore Colts (AP)
 Bobby Layne, Pittsburgh Steelers (AP-2)

Halfbacks
 Lenny Moore, Baltimore Colts (AP)
 Jon Arnett, Los Angeles Rams (AP)
 Frank Gifford, New York Giants (AP-2)
 Willie Galimore, Chicago Bears (AP-2)

Fullbacks
 Jim Brown, Cleveland Browns (AP)
 Alan Ameche, Baltimore Colts (AP-2)

Ends
 Raymond Berry, Baltimore Colts (AP)
 Del Shofner, Los Angeles Rams (AP)
 Jimmy Orr, Pittsburgh Steelers (AP-2)
 Pete Retzlaff, Philadelphia Eagles (AP-2)

Tackles
 Rosey Brown, New York Giants (AP)
 Jim Parker, Baltimore Colts (AP)
 Mike McCormack, Cleveland Browns (AP-2)
 Bob St. Clair, San Francisco 49ers (AP-2)

Guards
 Dick Stanfel, Washington Redkins (AP)
 Duane Putnam, Los Angeles Rams (AP)
 Jim Ray Smith, Cleveland Browns (AP-2)
 Art Spinney, Baltimore Colts (AP-2)

Centers
 Ray Wietecha, New York Giants (AP)
 Jim Ringo, Green Bay Packers (AP-2)

Defensive selections

Defensive ends
 Gino Marchetti, Baltimore Colts (AP)
 Andy Robustelli, New York Giants (AP)
 Doug Atkins, Chicago Bears (AP-2)
 Gene Brito, Washington Redskins (AP-2)

Defensive tackles
 Gene Lipscomb, Baltimore Colts (AP)
 Ernie Stautner, Pittsburgh Steelers (AP)
 Art Donovan, Baltimore Colts (AP-2)
 Rosey Grier, New York Giants (AP-2)

Middle guards
 Bill George, Chicago Bears (AP)
 Chuck Drazenovich, Washington Redskins (AP-2)

Linebackers
 Sam Huff, New York Giants (AP)
 Joe Schmidt, Detroit Lions (AP)
 Walt Michaels, Cleveland Browns (AP-2)
 Les Richter, Los Angeles Rams (AP-2)

Defensive backs
 Jack Butler, Pittsburgh Steelers (AP)
 Yale Lary, Detroit Lions (AP)
 Jim Patton, New York Giants (AP)
 Bobby Dillon, Green Bay Packers (AP)
 Andy Nelson, Baltimore Colts (AP-2)
 Will Sherman, Los Angeles Rams (AP-2)
 Carl Taseff, Baltimore Colts (AP-2)
 Night Train Lane, Chicago Cardinals (AP-2)

References

External links
 1958 NFL All-Pros – Pro-Football-Reference

All-Pro Teams
1958 National Football League season